France–Niger relations are the foreign relations between France and the Niger. Their relations are based on a long shared history and the more than sixty year rule of Niger by the French colonial empire, beginning with the French conquest in 1898. Niger obtained independence from France in 1960, and a history of French influenced culture and French language have been a point of commonality in the creation of a distinctive Nigerien culture from the diverse pre-colonial nationalities which make up modern Niger. France benefited economically from their time as a colonial power, and still relies on imports from Niger for elements of their economy.

Colonialism and decolonisation

Niger has maintained close ties with France, its former colonial power throughout the history of the Nigerien Republic. Following Niger's independence in 1960, France maintained several hundred advisers at all levels of Niger's government and military. In the 1960s, the Military of Niger was drawn entirely from Nigerien former members of the French Colonial Forces: officered by Frenchmen who agreed to take joint French-Nigerien citizenship.  In 1960 there were only ten African officers in the Nigerien army, all of low rank. President Diori signed legislation to end the employment of expatriate military officers in 1965, some continued to serve until the 1974 coup, when all French military presence was evacuated.  As well, the French had maintained until 1974 around 1000 troops of the 4th Régiment Interarmes d'Outre-Mer  (Troupes de Marine) with bases at Niamey, Zinder, Bilma and Agadez. In  1979 a smaller French force was again based permanently in Niger.

Current economic ties
France-Nigerien relations continue to be close, with France as Niger's top export partner (in value), and the French government being almost entirely dependent upon Niger for the Uranium which fuels its extensive Nuclear Power system, mined in the northern town of Arlit. Niger criticized France for the agreement saying that it should get a larger share of profits from uranium ore mining.

Diplomatic relations
While conflicts have developed and subsided between the two independent republics, France maintains a strong diplomatic presence in Niamey and several thousand French expatriates live across the nation.  Niger in turn maintains one of its only 24 foreign embassies in Paris along with three Honorary consular offices (in Bordeaux, Lyon, and Marseille) serving  a large expatriate and naturalised Niger born population which lives in France.

Mariama Hima, a former Nigerien minister of Social Development, served as an ambassador of Niger in Paris between 1997 and 2003.

Cultural ties

Nigerien national culture, made up as it is of a diverse group of pre-colonial national cultures, has been greatly influenced by French culture. The French language continues to be the official language of the Republic of Niger. Niger is a founding member of the Organisation internationale de la Francophonie.

Resident diplomatic missions 
 France has an embassy in Niamey.
 Niger has an embassy in Paris.

Notes and references

 
Niger
Bilateral relations of Niger
Relations of colonizer and former colony